St. Louis Exposition can refer to either:

Saint Louis Exposition (annual fair)
Louisiana Purchase Exposition (1904)